Verostonos (or Vernostonus) was a god in ancient Celtic polytheism, worshipped in Roman Britain.
His name links him to alder-trees. Altar-stones raised to him have been recovered in the United Kingdom, such as that at Ebchester in County Durham (RIB 1102, DEO VERNOSTONO COCIDIO VIRILIS GER V S L).
His association with Cocidius in that inscription suggests that he may have been linked with, or an epithet of, that more widely attested war god.

Etymology
Vernostonos may be derived from the Proto-Celtic *Werno-stonos meaning 'the Groaning of Alder-trunks ' (cf.   ).

Sources
British Museum, London, England.
Lancaster museum, Lancaster, England.
Newcastle Museum of Antiquities, Newcastle, England.
Penrith Museum, Penrith, England.
Verovicium Roman Museum, Housesteads Fort, Northumberland, England.
York Castle Museum, York, England.

Celtic gods
Gods of the ancient Britons